Elachyophtalma mimiocotana is a moth in the family Bombycidae. It was described by Walter Rothschild in 1920. It is found on New Guinea.

The wingspan is about 47 mm. The forewings are pale rufous. The hindwings are pale rufous.

References

Bombycidae
Moths described in 1920